Megalota archana is a species of moth of the family Tortricidae. It is found in Kenya, Nigeria, Tanzania and Uganda.

References

Moths described in 2004
Olethreutini